Saturday is the eleventh single released by British rock band The Enemy and the second from the album Streets in the Sky. The single was released in May 2012. In the spring there were two versions of the video for the song (one of them is acoustic). The song was also included in FIFA 13, the video game by EA Sports as a soundtrack.

The music video shows the members of the band singing on the blue background with words "Streets in the Sky" on the walls. And sometimes appear guy with the girlfriend, walking in the town. Saturday, saturday make it all OK! - the main words of the song, which describe Saturday as a day off.

References 

2012 songs
The Enemy (UK rock band) songs